The Overwhelmed and Annoyed Citizens is an extraparliamentary Spanish political party.

They are principally annoyed at the Spanish Judiciary.

Political parties in Spain
Political parties with year of establishment missing